C45 is a tar road in northern Namibia from B1 near Ohangwena to Oshakati.

Roads in Namibia
Ohangwena Region
Oshana Region